Meet the Boss was a series broadcast on the DuMont Television Network from June 10, 1952, to May 12, 1953. The series was hosted by Bill Cunningham and Robert Sullivan, who interviewed corporate and industry leaders.

Sullivan was a columnist for the New York Daily News and also appeared on the DuMont series What's the Story which aired 1951 to 1955.

Episode status
A single episode survives as part of the Peabody Award collection.

See also
List of programs broadcast by the DuMont Television Network
List of surviving DuMont Television Network broadcasts

References

Bibliography
David Weinstein, The Forgotten Network: DuMont and the Birth of American Television (Philadelphia: Temple University Press, 2004) 
Alex McNeil, Total Television, Fourth edition (New York: Penguin Books, 1980) 
Tim Brooks and Earle Marsh, The Complete Directory to Prime Time Network TV Shows, Third edition (New York: Ballantine Books, 1964)

External links
Meet the Boss at IMDB
DuMont historical website

DuMont Television Network original programming
1952 American television series debuts
1953 American television series endings
Black-and-white American television shows